This list of American films of 1916 is a compilation of American films released in the year 1916.



A–B

C–D

E–F

G–H

I–J

K–L

M–N

O–P

Q–R

S–T

U–V

W–Z

Short films

See also 
 1916 in the United States

References

External links 

 1916 films at the Internet Movie Database

1916
Films
Lists of 1916 films by country or language
1910s in American cinema